Divorcio is a studio album by Julio Iglesias. It was released in 2003 on Columbia Records.

Track listing

Charts

Year-end charts

Certifications

References 

2003 albums
Julio Iglesias albums
Columbia Records albums